"Where You Are" is a single released in 1997 by American neo soul singer Rahsaan Patterson. The song was released in support of his debut studio album, Rahsaan Patterson, and appeared on the Bulletproof soundtrack in 1996. "Where You Are" peaked at number 53 on the Billboard Hot R&B Singles chart. The song was released as a single in the UK in 1998.

Track listing
UK CD" single

Charts

References

1997 singles
Rahsaan Patterson songs
Songs written by Rahsaan Patterson
1997 songs
MCA Records singles